Kangean or Kangeanese, sometimes also spelt natively as  are the indigenous ethnic group native to the Indonesian island of Kangean in northern Bali Sea, who speak the Kangean language and share common history and culture.

Nomenclature

Terminology
The ‘’ (also spelt as ‘’ in Central Kangean) is an endonym term designated by the locals as ethnonym to identified themselves as a unified ethnic society bound by a common history; the term itself literally means "scion" (the descendant of notable family) in Kangean. It is likely that the ‘’ term might etymologically derived from the Makasar word ‘’, which means "empire" or "kingdom".

In Kangeanese literature, the word ‘’ itself was used throughout the Middle Ages to describe the Kangean island in general, it is still continued to be used to describe the ancentral homeland region of Kangean people in the central to eastern hemisphere of Kangean island, which known as the Kangayan district.

During the era of Dutch colonization over Indonesia, the Kangean Island identified either as ‘’, ‘’, or ‘’; meanwhile its inhabitants and their spoken language are called  (absorbed in English as ‘Kangeanese’, but ‘Kangean’ also used interchangeably; with ‘Kangeanese’ being the plural form, and ‘Kangean’ as the singular form). Due to the  terminology appearance in Dutch historical records, some also believed that the ethnonym of Kangeanese might have relation with the history of the Chinese-descendants people in western Kangean.

History

Toa — Prehistory 
Dates back to the 4,000 to 9,000 BC, archaeological researches shows that the Kangean people are one of the earliest inhabitants of the Indonesian Archipelago, it can be observed through the ancient archaeological discoveries found within the Arca Cave complex which located in the northwestern region of Kangean Island. Excavation discoveries also indicates that it is likely the Kangean people were once cavemens who practiced the hunter-gatherer culture.

Culture

Tradition

is a form of mixed performing arts that usually consist of traditional Kangeanese dances, folk songs and music, as well as attractions. This performing art is usually performed in traditional Kangeanese wedding celebrations and ceremonies. These form of performing art are uniquely native to the Kangean Islands and generally unknown outside of these region.

It is a form of traditional sport undeniably native to Lesser Sunda Islands, but however instead of using horses (like in Sumbawan and Bimanese culture) and bulls (like in Madurese culture), the Kangeanese  tend to use buffalos as their racing animal similar like the Balinese .

Not only  serve as intricate harvest festival form that has been mixed with the cultural influence of Javanese, these performing art also refers to the traditional native acappella-like way of chanting the rhythmic folk Kangeanese ritualistic song which usually chanted by the Kangeanese males who wear the traditional clothing as well as carrying a piece of cultural cloth.

Language and literature

Kangean language 

Although originally Kangeanese people are Austromelanesian; nowadays, the Kangean language are closely related and categorized as part of the Austronesian linguistic group. Kangean language varies distinctively across the Kangean Archipelago; the dialect spoken in the western regions are tend to have linguistic resemblance with the Madurese language spoken by Madurese people (the native of Madura Island), meanwhile the dialects in central to eastern regions shows significant differences, with the Sapeken and Saseel Kangean of East Kangean being the most spoken dialect in the easternmost coastal region.

Kangeanese literature 
Kangeanese literature covers all verbal and non-verbal literature in Kangean language; as well as literary works of Kangean origin but recorded in another languages (but usually not considered as canon). Kangean literature usually tells about topics related to folklores, tales, myths, as well as real historical records; such as the genealogy of kings, historical wars, and so on.

Folklore

The Kangeanese folklore generally encompasses various practices, representations, expressions, knowledges, or skills of Kangeanese that could be divided into two types; namely verbal and non-verbal folklores.

Influence
The folklore of Kangean has been influenced by another predominant ethnic groups who lived around the Bali Sea region; such as the Balinese originally from the Bali Island in southern Kangean, Madurese originally from the Madura Island in western Kangean, Javanese originally from the eastern region of Java Island in southwestern Kangean, Bugis and Makassar originally from the southern regions of Sulawesi Island in northeastern Kangean, as well as Tobelo originally from northern Maluku Islands. 
However, due to long progressive historical social contact with one another, the Kangeanese folklore also introduced back and brought some significant influences on another folklores; such as to the Javanese folklore found in eastern Java region, as far as to the folklore of the Betawi ethnic group in the northern coastal region of western Java (formerly known as Sunda Kalapa in pre-colonial era).

Religion and beliefs 
In modern era, the majority of Kangean people are Muslim (predominantly adhered to Sunni of Nahdlatul Ulama). Before the adoption of Hinduism, Buddhism, Confucianism and Islam in general, the indigenous Kangean people had a belief in invisible spiritual power entities that can be both benevolent or malevolent (these kind of belief somehow related to the Kapitayan, which is a monotheistic religion of Javanese people in Java). Ancient indigenous peoples also believed that deceased ancestors did not really disappear from the world, but rather the ancestral spirits could metamorphose and acquire spiritual powers such as gods (or goddess) and remain involved in their descendants worldly affairs. That is one of the reasons why worship and reverence to honor ancestors is an important element in the belief system of indigenous Kangean people. Some Kangean tribal communities still preserve those kind of ancient belief and also assimilate it into the religion that is now commonly practiced in Kangean (mainly Islam), which resulted in a new belief known as Islam Nusantara, which is a form of folk-based religion that practiced throughout the Indonesian archipelago.

Sub-groups and diaspora 
Kangeanese people are generally unified under the same historical background; there are sociocultural group divisions (indigenously) which can be seen within its community based on the ancestry lineage of each group (division grouping started massively during the colonial era).

The  refers to the Kangeanese people who natively originated from the central region of Kangean Island, sometimes these group of people are also known as the  colloquially which referred to their mountainous origin place region.



Nomenclature 
The  nowadays in modern Kangean might refers to any foreigners who settled in Kangean generally.

Legacy  
The  group is probably the most influential group amongst all, it can be examined through the cultural perspective of Kangeanese that exhibit clear Javanese-derived elements. In terms of linguistics, the Kangean language and literatures practiced by the majority of Kangeanese are indeed heavily influenced by Javanese (through liturgical Old Javanese form).



Nomenclature and overview 
The  mainly and originally refers to the Kangeanese people of Chinese-descent. The terminology of  itself historically means "[the descendants] of ", but nowadays might understood as "the settlement of Chinese" in modern Kangean, initially used in western Kangean region; it bears similar meaning with "Chinatown" in English.

Nowadays, the majority of Kangeanese people of Chinese-descent experiencing difficulties to trace their history (e.g. the ancestral origin place in mainland China, etc.) due to lack of survived historical records; however, analyzing from the common archaic surnames used by the Kangeanese, these  group could possibly linked to the Qin dynasty, which is a dynasty of Imperial China dates back to 221–206 BC era.

Their Chinese cultural elements however might have almost disappeared but tend to merge into local Kangeanese culture, the physical appearance of the  group also did not really shows ‘the Chinese characteristics’ (e.g. monolid, etc.) like any other Chinese Indonesians's appearance in general probably due to high rate of intermarriage with the native Kangeanese.

Legacy 
According to the Kangeanese people, some of their traditional Kangean houses' styles are basically Chinese-derived, thus sometimes the ‘’ also used by the locals to refers the decorative style of their house.

Kangeanese diaspora 
The Kangeanese diaspora is the demographic group of descendants of ethnic Kangenese who emigrated from the Kangean Archipelago to other regions in Indonesia or other parts of the world in general.

See also 
 Kangeanese folklore – the folklore of Kangeanese people
 Kangean Archipelago – the archipelago located in northern Bali Sea
 Kangean Island – the main island of Kangean Archipelago
 Kangean language – the spoken language of Kangeanese people 
  – the ceremonial tradition of Kangeanese people

References

Notes

Bibliography 

*

External links 

Indigenous peoples of Southeast Asia
Ethnic groups in Indonesia